Rotunda or The Rotunda may refer to:

 Rotunda (architecture), any building with a circular ground plan, often covered by a dome

Places

Czech Republic
 Znojmo Rotunda, in Znojmo, Czech Republic

Greece
 Arch of Galerius and Rotunda, Rotunda of St. George, built in Thessaloniki in 306 AD

Ireland
 Rotunda Hospital, Dublin, Ireland

Malta
 Rotunda of Mosta, in Mosta, Malta

Moldova
 Rotunda, Edineț, a commune in Edineţ District, Moldova

Romania
 Rotunda, Olt, a commune in Olt County
 Rotunda, a village in Corbeni Commune, Argeș County
 Rotunda, a village in Buza Commune, Cluj County
 Rotunda, a village in Doljești Commune, Neamț County
 Rotunda, a village administered by Liteni town, Suceava County
 Rotunda, a tributary of the Bistrița in Suceava County
 Rotunda (Lăpuș), a tributary of the Lăpuș in Maramureș County

United Kingdom
 Rotunda, Birmingham, a cylindrical highrise building in Birmingham
 Rotunda, Woolwich, a John Nash building in Woolwich, London
 Blackfriars Rotunda (1787–1958), a building in Southwark
 The Rotunda at Ranelagh Gardens, London, a former fashionable social meeting place and function room
 Rotunda Museum, a museum of geology in Scarborough, North Yorkshire, England
 Glasgow Harbour Tunnel Rotundas, flanking the River Clyde in Scotland
 Rotunda, Aldershot, a former Methodist church in Aldershot, Hampshire

United States
 The Rotunda (Baltimore), a mixed-use property in northern Baltimore, Maryland
 The Rotunda (Hermann, Missouri), listed on the NRHP in Missouri
 The Rotunda (University of Virginia)
 D'Alemberte Rotunda, on the campus of Florida State University
 Ford Rotunda, a former tourist attraction in Dearborn, Michigan
 United States Capitol rotunda, in Washington, D.C.

Music
 Fat Albert Rotunda, a 1969 album by Herbie Hancock
 "Rotunda", a song on the 1977 album Inner Voices, by McCoy Tyner
 "Rotunda", a 2011 single by Markus Schulz
 "Rotunda", a 1970 song by Tom Rush on the album Wrong End of the Rainbow

People
 Kyndra Rotunda (born 1973), American legal academic
 Ronald Rotunda (born 1945), American legal academic
 Mike Rotunda (born  1958), American professional wrestler
 Bray Wyatt (Windham Rotunda; born 1987), American professional wrestler and son of Mike Rotunda
 Bo Dallas (Taylor Rotunda; born 1990), American professional wrestler and son of Mike Rotunda

Other uses
 Rotunda (geometry), a family of dihedral-symmetric polyhedra with alternating pentagons and triangles around an axis
 Rotunda (script), a specific medieval blackletter script
 Rotunda radicals, or Rotundists, London radical reformers who gathered around the Blackfriars Rotunda in the 1830s
 A localized term for a traffic roundabout